TheTVDB.com is a community driven database of television shows. All content and images on the site have been contributed by the site's users; the site uses moderated editing to maintain its own standards.

Purpose
The stated aim to be the most complete and accurate source of information on TV series from many languages and countries. It provides a repository of series, season and episode images that can be used in various types of Home theater PC software to make the visual interface experience more appealing.

Applications
The site has a full JSON API that allows other software and websites to use this information. The API is currently being used by the myTV add-in for Windows Media Center, Jellyfin, Zappiti, Kodi (formerly XBMC); Plex; the meeTVshows and TVNight plugins for Meedio (a digital recorder acquired by Yahoo.com); the MP-TVSeries plugin for MediaPortal, Numote (iPhone/Android app and set-top device), and more.

History
In 2019, TheTVDB was acquired by TV Time, who used TheTVDB's database as a source for all the TV shows and episode descriptions in it.

As of 2020, the API now requires a license subscription from either application developers or end users.

References

External links
 – official site

Online databases
Television websites
Internet properties established in 2007